The 1916 United States presidential election in Nebraska took place on November 7, 1916, as part of the 1916 United States presidential election. Voters chose eight representatives, or electors, to the Electoral College, who voted for president and vice president.

Nebraska was won by incumbent President Woodrow Wilson (D–Virginia), and incumbent Vice-President Thomas R. Marshall, with 55.28% of the popular vote, against former and future Supreme Court Justice Charles Evans Hughes (R–New York), running with the 26th vice president of the United States Charles W. Fairbanks, with 40.99% of the popular vote. , this is the last occasion when Keya Paha County voted for a Democratic Presidential candidate.

Results

Results by county

See also
 United States presidential elections in Nebraska

References

Nebraska
1916
1916 Nebraska elections